The Incredible Kung Fu Master, also known as The Kung Fu Master is a 1979 martial arts action comedy film directed by Joe Cheung in his directorial debut and starring Sammo Hung and Stephen Tung, the latter in his first leading role. This film features an action direction from a number of famous action directors including Sammo Hung Stunt Team, Lam Ching-ying, Billy Chan, Bryan Leung and Yuen Biao.

Plot
Two brothers Lee Chun Fei (Wong Ha), a Wing Chun stylist, and Lee Chun Pang (Peter Chan), a Five Animals stylist, encounters a town bully Yeung Wai (Lee Hoi Sang) harassing a civilian. Together, with their own distinctive kung fu style, the brothers defeat Yeung and are praised by the townsmen. Later, when the townsmen debate on who is the better martial artist of the two, the brothers become bitter rivals and start their own martial arts schools. Then a rich man Chin Fung (Phillip Ko) hires the two brothers to teach his sons, the crooked-eyed Big Dog (Addy Sung), and Little Dog (Chung Fat). Big Dog becomes Fei's disciple and Little Dog becomes Pang's disciple. Meanwhile, a local young kung fu fanatic Sei Leng Chai (Stephen Tung) is trying to create his own kung fu style and befriends a wandering winemaker Fei Chai (Sammo Hung), who is an expert martial artist. Fei Chai advises Sei Leng Chai to learn every style of kung fu he can and he starts studying from Fei Chai, Fei and Pang. Later, it is revealed that Yeung is actually Chin's kung fu senior and he sent his fake sons to study under them to understand their styles more.  Chin wants to cripple Fei and Pang to avenge Yeung. As they fight, Sei Leng Chai comes to help and the brothers eventually reconcile their brotherhood. Sei Leng kills Chin and Yeung arrives to defeat and capture Sei Leng Chai while Fei Chai comes to the rescue and kills Yeung.

Cast
Sammo Hung as Fei Chai
Stephen Tung as Sei Leng Chai
Cecilia Wong as Lee Ching Ching
Philip Ko as Chin Fung
Hoi Sang Lee as Yeung Wai
Mang Hoi as Hoi
Adam Sung as Big Dog
Chung Fat as Little Dog
Wong Ha as Lee Chun Fei
Peter Chan as Lee Chun Pang
Austin Wai as Invincible
Ho Pak Kwong as Grain store boss
Fung King Man as Three shells man
Lam Ching-ying as kung fu student
Tsang Cho Lam as gambler
Mars as one of Yeung Wai's men
Billy Chan as Snake Fist stylist
Yuen Lung Kui as one of Yeung Wai's men
Wellson Chin as student
Lai Kim Hung as student
To Wai Wu as student
Cheung Chok Chow as villager
Yeung Sai Kwan as one of Yeung Wai's men
Lung Ying
Cheng Sek Au as gambler
Chow Kam Kong
Ka Lee as student
Chan Ming Wai as student
Leung Hung as gambler
Ho Lai Lam as student
Tu Chia Cheng
Johnny Cheung

Box office
The film grossed HK$2,072,922.70 at the Hong Kong box office during its theatrical run from 26 January to 7 February 1979 in Hong Kong.

See also
Sammo Hung filmography
Yuen Biao filmography

External links

The Incredible Kung Fu Master at Hong Kong Cinemagic

1979 films
1979 directorial debut films
1970s action comedy films
1970s martial arts comedy films
Hong Kong martial arts comedy films
Kung fu films
Hong Kong action comedy films
1970s Cantonese-language films
Films set in China
1979 comedy films
1970s Hong Kong films